is a Japanese lawyer specializing in international law. He is on the board of directors of the NGO Japan Center for Conflict Prevention.

During the 1990s he served as Director-General of the North American Affairs Bureau of the Japanese Ministry of Foreign Affairs, and as Japanese Ambassador to Denmark and Lithuania. From 2001 to 2004, he was the Japanese Ambassador to the United Kingdom. In 2005, served as Special Envoy for UN Reform on behalf of the Japanese Ministry of Foreign Affairs. He is a member of the Japanese chapter of the International Law Association.

Works (partial list)
 "Practices in Japan Concerning the Conclusion of Treaties", Japanese Annual of International Law, vol. 27 (1984)

References

External links
 "Government decides seven ambassadorial appointments" Japan Times, September 12, 2001
 List of the directors of Japan Center for Conflict Prevention, mentioning Orita

1942 births
Living people
University of Tokyo alumni
Ambassadors of Japan to the United Kingdom
Ambassadors of Japan to Lithuania
Ambassadors of Japan to Denmark
Consuls General of Japan in Hong Kong